Caliente is the debut album by Venezuelan group Calle Ciega released on 1998 and re-released on August 6, 2002.

Track listing

 Que Sigan Bailando
 Caliente
 El Huracán
 Calle Ciega
 Con La Punta 'El Pie
 Meneate
 Sexy
 Hay Fuego
 Quiero Que Tu Piel Se Erice
 Me Gustan Nenas Sexy
 Si Tu No Estás
 Una Fan Enamorada

1998 albums
Merengue albums
Latin music albums by Venezuelan artists